Abducent may refer to:
 As an anatomical terms of motion, used to a structure that is "abducting"  
 The abducent nerve